Simon Lalong CON (born 5 May 1963 in Shendam, Plateau State) is a Nigerian lawyer and politician, who is the incumbent Governor of Plateau State, Nigeria.

Education

After his elementary and secondary schools education in Shendam Local Government Area, he proceeded to the School of Preliminary Studies (S.P.S) Keffi, passing out in 1986. He then continued to Ahmadu Bello University, Zaria, graduating in 1990 with a bachelor's degree in Law. This was immediately followed by the Law School in Lagos, where he was also called to the Bar. He later obtained a master's degree in Law from the University of Jos, in 1996.

Professional career

Lalong's professional career as an attorney lasted between 1992, the year following his graduation from law school, and 1998, the dawn of Nigeria's new democracy. During this period he worked with a few law firms, one of which he co-owned. Between 1992 and 1994, he was the Deputy Scribe of the Nigerian Bar Association in Plateau State. After a political stint that lasted seven years he again returned to legal practice as the Principal Partner of Simon B Lalong and Co, until 2015.

Political life

In 1998 Lalong temporarily discarded legal practice to pursue a political career. Representing the People's Democratic Party (PDP), he successfully contested his native Shendam Constituency and entered the Plateau State House of Assembly. In October 2000, he became the speaker of the assembly, occupying that position until 2006, following a political upheaval within the House. The seven years which he served as the speaker made him the longest serving speaker of the House in the history of Plateau State. During that period he was two times (2001–2002) elected as the Chairman of the Conference of Speakers of the 36 states of Nigeria.

In the year 2015, as the second tenure of the serving governor of Plateau State, Jonah Jang, neared its end, Lalong joined the contest to succeed Jang. This time he did so on the All Progressive Congress (APC) political platform. He was sworn in as the new governor of Plateau State on May 29, 2015.

In the March 9 2019 Plateau gubernatorial election and March 23, 2019 Plateau State supplementary Gubernatorial Election, Lalong won re-election as governor of Plateau State, having polled 595,582 votes against his rival, General Jeremiah Husseini of the People's Democratic Party (PDP), who polled 546,813 votes. He was re-elected as the governor of Plateau State on May 29, 2019.

See also
List of Governors of Plateau State

Award 
In October 2022, a Nigerian national honour of Commander Of The Order Of The Niger (CON) was conferred on him by President Muhammadu Buhari.

References

1963 births
Living people
Ahmadu Bello University alumni
Governors of Plateau State
University of Jos alumni
People from Plateau State
All Progressives Congress state governors of Nigeria